Davin is a hamlet in the Canadian province of Saskatchewan, located approximately 40 km East of Regina.

Demographics 

References

Designated places in Saskatchewan
Lajord No. 128, Saskatchewan
Organized hamlets in Saskatchewan
Division No. 6, Saskatchewan